Jean Michel Karam (born 1969) is an Engineer, inventor, and entrepreneur in the field of microelectronics, Telecommunications, Information Technology, and Mobile devices Repair software and Hardware engineers.

Education 

When he arrived in France in 1990, Karam received an Electrical Engineering degree in 1993 from the Ecole Supérieure d'Ingénieurs en Electrotechnique et Electronique de Paris (ESIEE Paris) and a master's degree in Microelectronics from the Université de Paris VII. In 1996, he received a PhD in Microelectronics from the Institut National Polytechnique de Grenoble (INPG).

Career 
In 1994, he began his career as a research engineer at the TIMA-CM (Techniques de l'Informatique et de la Micro-électronique pour l'Architecture Informatique) laboratory in Grenoble, France. This Research & Development center associated with the Centre National de Recherche Scientifique (CNRS) and the INPG allowed him to gain his first work as a Research Director heading up a team of researchers focused on the design and fabrication methods of microelectromechanical systems (MEMS). Three years after its creation, it comprised 35 researchers for MEMS research.

In November 1997, Karam founded his first company, MEMSCAP, a supplier of products based on MEMS technology. During its first two years, Karam raised more than €13 million euros from venture capital in order to develop his company and finance his research programs.

On March 2, 2001, MEMSCAP had its went public on the Eurolist C of the NYSE Euronext, Paris (code ISIN: FR0010298620-MEMS), raising 101 million euros (140 million US dollars), on a basis of 430 million euros of market capitalization, making his company a leading player in the market of MEMS with high added value.

In 2002, Karam initiated research on applied technology in dermatology and skincare within INTUISKIN, at that time a fully owned subsidiary of his MEMSCAP Group.

In 2010, in association with a group of investors and figures from the cosmetics industry, he decided to spin-off INTUISKIN from MEMSCAP. In this context, he launched the skincare brand IOMA, a collaboration between technology experts and dermatology and cosmetics specialists, of which the former president of Thierry Mugler, Véra Strubi, presently a member of the board of directors.  Karam is Chairman and CEO of both MEMSCAP and INTUISKIN/IOMA. He is also the president of the LEYLA charity, a non-profit association which fights against orphan or rare diseases.

Additionally, Jean Michel Karam continues to be involved in innovation and research – he currently owns more than 80 patents – as well as contributing to numerous scientific and economic publications.

IEVA 

In 2016, Jean Michel Karam founded IEVA with David Moulinier (currently Managing Director of IEVA) and other prominent names in the industry. IEVA is the result of the convergence of the know-how acquired over more than twenty years by its team of engineers with expertise in microelectronics, sensors, micro-mechanics and artificial intelligence and the experience of more than ten years in research and development in the field of personalized cosmetics.

Awards 
Karam and his company have received over 10 international awards including:

 U.S. Commercial Service (USCS) of the United States Department of Commerce – Award of Excellence for international commercial development (2012)
 SEMICON MicroNanoSystems Innovation Award (2009)
 European Semiconductor/Wacker Siltronics Award for best European start-up company (2001)
 Deloitte & Touche Technology “Fast 50” First Prize for Rhone-Alps region, France (2001 and 2002)
 Euronext Special Prize for “First listed company in Rhone-Alpes Region” (2002)
 AGEFI Grand Prize of Venture Capitalist (2002)
 The French Stock-IT Award for the company with the highest growth (2001 and 2002)

References 

1969 births
Living people
French electrical engineers
French businesspeople
French people of Lebanese descent
People from Matn District
Research directors of the French National Centre for Scientific Research